And So It Goes is a 2012 studio album by American country singer Don Williams. It is his first studio album since My Heart to You in 2004. Released on June 19, 2012 on Sugar Hill Records for US market, the album was made available earlier on April 30, 2012 in certain non-US markets including the UK.

The album is produced by Nashville producer Garth Fundis, with whom he had worked for 17 years on many of his greatest successes. It includes a number of collaborations including notably Alison Krauss, Keith Urban and Vince Gill who contribute vocals and play instruments on the record. Contributing songwriters included Kieran Kane, Ronnie Bowman, Al Anderson and Leslie Satcher, Don's son Tim Williams, as well as Don Williams himself.

"She's a Natural" was originally a Top 20 hit single for Rob Crosby from his 1990 debut album Solid Ground.

Track listing

Personnel

 Al Anderson - electric guitar
 David Angell - violin
 Sam Bacco - marimba
 J.T. Corenflos - electric guitar
 David Davidson - violin
 Billy Davis - background vocals
 Chip Davis - background vocals
 Jeneé Fleenor - fiddle
 Garth Fundis - background vocals
 John Gardner - drums, percussion
 Vince Gill - electric guitar, soloist, background vocals
 Alison Krauss - fiddle and duet vocals on "I Just Came Here for the Music"
 Matt McKenzie - bass guitar, upright bass
 Kenny Malone - percussion
 Anthony LaMarchina - cello
 Mike Noble - acoustic guitar
 Russ Pahl - banjo, dobro, steel guitar, mandolin
 Tyson Rogers - accordion, organ, piano, electric piano
 Billy Sanford - acoustic guitar, electric guitar, gut string guitar, tic tac bass
 Pam Sixfin - violin
 Chris Stapleton - background vocals
 Keith Urban - electric guitar and duet vocals on "Imagine That"
 Kris Wilkinson - string arrangements, viola
 Don Williams - lead vocals
 Tim Williams - background vocals

Charts

References

2012 albums
Don Williams albums
Sugar Hill Records albums
Albums produced by Garth Fundis